Chocolatey is a machine-level, command-line package manager and installer for software on Microsoft Windows. It uses the NuGet packaging infrastructure and Windows PowerShell to simplify the process of downloading and installing software.

In April 2014, Microsoft debuted OneGet (renamed PackageManagement on March 20, 2015) alongside PowerShell 5. It is a free and open-source package-provider manager, which provides a way to integrate other package managers into PowerShell. OneGet was pre-configured to browse the Chocolatey repository.

The name is an extension on a pun of NuGet (from "nougat") "because everyone loves Chocolatey nougat".

Many Windows developers recommend
that Windows developers
install both Chocolatey and Scoop.

References

External links
 
 

Command-line software
Free package management systems
Free software programmed in C Sharp